The 1932 Cork Senior Football Championship was the 44th staging of the Cork Senior Football Championship since its establishment by the Cork County Board in 1887.

Macroom were the defending champions.

On 18 September 1932, Beara won the championship following a 2-02 to 1-01 defeat of Clonakilty in the final at the Mardyke. This was their first ever championship title while they also became the first divisional side to win the championship.

Results

Final

Championship statistics

Miscellaneous

Beara became the first division to win the title.
Clonakilty qualify for the final for the first time.

References

Cork Senior Football Championship